Antonia Murphy is an Australian former actress, best known for her role as Lynn Palmer Hardy in the television soap opera Sons and Daughters.

Other television credits include Prime Time, Brides of Christ, The Dingo Principle, Water Rats, Home and Away, Wildside, Grass Roots and All Saints.

Filmography

External links
 

Australian soap opera actresses
Living people
Place of birth missing (living people)
Year of birth missing (living people)